Sweet Sour is the second album by English rock band Band of Skulls. It was released on 20 February 2012 in England and 21 February 2012 in the United States.

Ian Davenport returned to produce the album after working with the band on their debut. The album was recorded at Rockfield Studios in Wales.

Track listing

Personnel
Russell Marsden – vocals, guitar
Emma Richardson – bass guitar, vocals
Matt Hayward – drums

Charts

References

Band of Skulls albums
2012 albums
Albums recorded at Rockfield Studios